The 2016 Spengler Cup was an ice hockey competition held in Davos, Switzerland from December 26 to December 31, 2016. All matches were played at HC Davos's home known as Vaillant Arena. Six competing teams were split into two groups of three (in the round-robin series). The two groups, named Torriani and Cattini, are named after legendary Swiss hockey players Richard 'Bibi' Torriani and the Cattini brothers, Hans and Ferdinand.

Teams participating
The list of teams that are participating in the tournament are as listed.

  HC Davos (host)
  Team Canada
  HC Dinamo Minsk
  HC Lugano
  Avtomobilist Yekaterinburg
  Mountfield HK

Match officials

Group stage

Key
 W (regulation win) – 3 pts.
 OTW (overtime/shootout win) – 2 pts.
 OTL (overtime/shootout loss) – 1 pt.
 L (regulation loss) – 0 pts.

Group Torriani

Group Cattini

Knockout stage

Quarterfinals

Semifinals

Final

Champions

All-Star Team

Statistics

Scoring leaders
As of Game 9

GP = Games played; G = Goals; A = Assists; Pts = Points

Television broadcast

Notes

References

Spengler Cup
Spengler Cup
Spengler Cup
Spengler Cup
Spengler Cup
Spengler Cup